Bio or BIO may refer to:

Computing
 bio(4), a pseudo-device driver in RAID controller management interface in OpenBSD and NetBSD
 Block I/O, a concept in computer data storage

Politics
 Julius Maada Bio (born 1964), Sierra Leonean politician, president since April 4, 2018

Media and entertainment
 Bio (Australian TV channel)
 The Biography Channel (UK and Ireland)

 Bio (graffiti artist) Wilfredo Feliciano (born 1966)
 Bio (album), a Chuck Berry album released in 1973

Organizations
 Bedford Institute of Oceanography
 Biographers International Organization
 Biotechnology Innovation Organization
 Belgian Investment Company for Developing Countries

Energy
 Biofuel, fuel made from biomass
Biodiesel, the biofuel alternative for diesel
Biogas, a blend of gasses formed by the breakdown of organic matter used in renewable energy production
Biogasoline, the biofuel alternative for gasoline

Places
 Bio, Azerbaijan, village in Astara Rayon
 Bio, Lot, commune in France
 Bilbao Airport, Spain, IATA airport code BIO
 British Indian Ocean Territory, ITU code BIO

Other uses
 Biography (abbreviation)
 Bioplastic, plastic made from biomass
 British Informatics Olympiad
 Bio, prefix and abbreviation of biology

See also
 Bios (disambiguation)